The 2006 FIFA World Cup qualification UEFA Group 1 was a UEFA qualifying group for the 2006 FIFA World Cup. The group comprised Andorra, Armenia, Czech Republic, Finland, Macedonia and Netherlands and Romania.

The group was won by Netherlands, who qualified for the 2006 FIFA World Cup. The runners-up Czech Republic entered the UEFA qualification play-offs.

Standings

Matches

Goalscorers

9 goals

 Jan Koller

8 goals

 Alexei Eremenko

7 goals

 Ruud Van Nistelrooy
 Adrian Mutu

6 goals

 Tomáš Rosický

5 goals

 Milan Baroš
 Vratislav Lokvenc
 Goran Pandev

4 goals

 Jan Polák
 Mikael Forssell
 Phillip Cocu

3 goals

 Ara Hakobyan
 Dirk Kuyt
 Daniel Pancu

2 goals

 Marek Heinz
 Shefki Kuqi
 Aki Riihilahti
 Goran Maznov
 Arjen Robben
 Wesley Sneijder
 Rafael Van der Vaart
 Pierre Van Hooijdonk
 Gheorghe Bucur
 Florin Cernat
 Nicolae Mitea

1 goal

 Marc Bernaus
 Marc Pujol
 Gabriel Riera
 Fernando Silva
 Karen Dokhoyan
 Aram Hakobyan
 Romik Khachatryan
 Edgar Manucharyan
 Armen Shahgeldyan
 Tomáš Galásek
 Marek Jankulovski
 Tomáš Jun
 Vladimír Šmicer
 Jonatan Johansson
 Jari Litmanen
 Paulus Roiha
 Teemu Tainio
 Hannu Tihinen
 Artim Šakiri
 Aco Stojkov
 Veliče Šumulikoski
 Aleksandar Vasoski
 Ryan Babel
 Wilfred Bouma
 Romeo Castelen
 Barry Opdam
 Robin Van Persie
 Ciprian Marica
 Marius Niculae
 Florentin Petre
 Ovidiu Petre

1 own goal

 Óscar Sonejee (playing against Armenia)

1
2004–05 in Dutch football
qual
2004–05 in Romanian football
2005–06 in Romanian football
2004–05 in Czech football
qual
2004–05 in Republic of Macedonia football
2005–06 in Republic of Macedonia football
2004–05 in Andorran football
2005–06 in Andorran football
2004 in Finnish football
2005 in Finnish football
2004 in Armenian football
2005 in Armenian football